Choristoneura conflictana, the large aspen tortrix, is a moth of the family Tortricidae. The species was first described by Francis Walker in 1863. It is found from the Pacific to the Atlantic coast and from Alaska to California, Arizona, and New Mexico.

The wingspan is 25–35 mm. Adults are on wing from May to August.

The larvae feed on Populus tremuloides.

References

External links

Choristoneura
Moths described in 1863